Morganton is the name of some places in the United States of America:

Morganton, Georgia
Morganton, North Carolina
Morganton, Tennessee, former city in East Tennessee, near modern-day Greenback

See also
Morgantown (disambiguation)